Dear Mom, Love Cher is a 2013 American television documentary about Georgia Holt, mother of singer and actress Cher. The film, directed by P. David Ebersole, recounts Cher's family history and features in-depth interviews with her, Holt, Holt's other daughter Georganne LaPiere, and Holt's grandchildren, from Cher, Chaz Bono and Elijah Blue Allman.

The film premiered on Lifetime on May 6, 2013, with a worldwide VOD/DVD release on September 24, 2013, simultaneous with Cher's 25th studio album, Closer to the Truth.

Cast
 Georgia Holt
 Cher
 Georganne LaPiere
 Chaz Bono
 Elijah Blue Allman

Accolades
 Won – Women's Image Network Award for Outstanding Show Produced by a Woman – Cher
 Nominated – Women's Image Network Awards for Outstanding Documentary Film – The Ebersole Hughes Company and Lifetime

References

External links

American documentary films
2013 documentary films
Cher
Documentary films about women in music
2013 television films
2013 films
Films directed by P. David Ebersole
2010s American films